Yuri van der Heijden (born 20 July 1990) is a Brazilian field hockey player. He competed in the men's field hockey tournament at the 2016 Summer Olympics.

References

1990 births
Living people
Sportspeople from Eindhoven
People with acquired Brazilian citizenship
Brazilian male field hockey players
Olympic field hockey players of Brazil
Field hockey players at the 2016 Summer Olympics
Place of birth missing (living people)
South American Games bronze medalists for Brazil
South American Games medalists in field hockey
Competitors at the 2014 South American Games
Competitors at the 2022 South American Games
Brazilian people of Dutch descent
21st-century Brazilian people